Rasanara Kephatulla Parwin (born 4 May 1992) is an Indian cricketer who plays as a right-arm off break bowler for the India national women's cricket team, making her debut in the 2013 Women's Cricket World Cup against the West Indies.

References

External links
 

1992 births
Living people
People from Balangir
Cricketers from Odisha
Sportswomen from Odisha
Odisha women cricketers
Indian women cricketers
India women One Day International cricketers
India women Twenty20 International cricketers